Presidential elections were held in Brazil on 1 March 1902. The result was a victory for Rodrigues Alves of the Paulista Republican Party, who received 91.7% of the vote.

Results

References

Presidential elections in Brazil
Brazil
1902 in Brazil
March 1902 events
Election and referendum articles with incomplete results
Elections of the First Brazilian Republic